Katharina Henot or Henoth (1570 – 19 May 1627) was a German postmaster and an alleged witch, burned at the stake for sorcery in Cologne. She is one of the best-known German victims of the witch hunt, and the best known case in Cologne. She was probably also the first female postmaster in Germany.

Biography
Katharina Henot was a well-known and influential citizen in Cologne, and was married to Heinrich Neuden. Together with her brother, Hartger Henot (1571–1637), she had inherited the postal office from her father Jacob and worked as perhaps the first female postmaster in Germany. They were in a conflict in the Imperial court with Count Leonhard II von Taxis, who wished to create a central post office. From 1626 to 1631, a great witch trial was held in the city of Cologne. In 1627, a nun in the convent in the city had become "obsessed". Rumors pointed out Henot, and the commission of the archbishop arrested both Henot and her brother in January 1627 and accused them of having caused several cases of death and sickness in the convent by use of magic. She was imprisoned and denied bail and protection.

Henot refused to admit anything, even after being severely injured and sick from torture. She was in spite of this judged guilty and sentenced to be burned alive at the stake for sorcery. Her brother Hartger Henot tried to get her freed by appealing directly to the Imperial court, but did not succeed. The trial against her is considered to have been juridically incorrect even according to the law of the time. Later research has established the opinion that Henot was the victim of a conspiracy by the authorities of the city. Her brother tried to get her name cleared after her execution, but in 1629, he was himself pointed out as a witch by Christina Plum, one of the victims of the 1626–31 Cologne witch trials. He was arrested in 1631 together with a number of other influential citizens, but the witch trial was interrupted soon after by intervention.

The City Council of Cologne issued a resolution on 28 June 2012 to exonerate Katharina Henot and the other victims of the persecution of witches in Cologne.

See also
 Gese Wechel, Swedish equivalent 
 Dorothea Krag, Danish equivalent
 Alexandrine von Taxis, Imperial equivalent

References

 Engelbert Goller, Jakob Henot, Inaugural-Dissertation, Bonn 1910
 Friedrich Wilhelm Siebel, Die Hexenverfolgung in Köln, Juristische Dissertation, Bonn 1959
 
 Artikel von Thomas Becker (Historicum.net) 
 Aufsatz von Gerd Schwerhoff, (MS Word)
 Katharina Henoth wird als Hexe verbrannt, Sendung "ZeitZeichen"  19 May 2007 auf den Seiten des WDR 5
 weitere Darstellung
 Telegraph

1570 births
Executed German people
People executed for witchcraft
People from Cologne
Executed German women
German postmasters
17th-century German people
1627 deaths
16th-century German people
16th-century German women
17th-century German women
People executed in the Holy Roman Empire by burning
Witch trials in Germany
17th-century executions in the Holy Roman Empire